The Rink is a musical with a book by Terrence McNally, lyrics by Fred Ebb, and music by John Kander, the tenth Kander and Ebb collaboration.

The musical focuses on Anna, the owner of a dilapidated roller skating rink on the boardwalk of a decaying seaside resort, who has decided to sell it to developers. Complicating her plans are her prodigal daughter Angel, who returns to town seeking to reconnect with the people and places she long ago left behind. Through a series of flashbacks, revelations, and minimal forward-moving plot development, the two deal with their pasts in their attempt to reconcile and move on with their lives.

Production history

Background
The musical began as a small off-Broadway musical with music by Kander and Ebb, the book by Albert Innaurato, and direction by Arthur Laurents, focusing on an Italian-American mother and her estranged daughter. As the project was not doing well, Terrence McNally was brought in to write the book and Laurents left. In place of the intimate musical, there were now a small male chorus and large sets.

Productions
The musical opened on Broadway on February 9, 1984 at the Martin Beck Theatre, where it ran for 204 performances and 29 previews.  The production was directed by A. J. Antoon, with choreography by Graciela Daniele, set design by Peter Larkin, costume design by Theoni V. Aldredge, lighting design by Marc B. Weiss, sound design by Otts Munderloh, and musical direction by Paul Gemignani.

Despite the presence of box-office draws Liza Minnelli (as Angel) and Chita Rivera (as Anna), it could not overcome the mostly negative reviews. The cast also included Jason Alexander (Lino/Lenny/Punk/Uncle Fausto), Kim Hauser (Little Girl), Mel Johnson, Jr. (Buddy/Hiram/Mrs. Jackson/Charlie/Suitor/Junior Miller), Scott Holmes (Guy/Dino/Father Rocco/Debbie Duberman), Scott Ellis (Lucky/Sugar/Punk/Arnie/Suitor/Bobby Perillo/Danny/Additional singer), Frank Mastrocola (Tony/Tom/Punk/Suitor/Peter Reilly), Ronn Carroll (Ben/Dino's Father/Sister Philomena), and Rob Marshall (additional singers). Stockard Channing replaced Liza Minnelli as of July 14, 1984.

The musical had an engagement in the West End at the Cambridge Theatre, opening on February 17, 1988 through March 19, 1988, running for 38 performances.  Josephine Blake and Diane Langton starred as Anna and Angel.  This production, directed by Paul Kerryson, whilst not successful at the large Cambridge Theatre in London, had enjoyed sell out success at the smaller Forum Theatre in Manchester in 1987, where its run had been extended. On the day that notices were issued that the show was to close, the cast, orchestra and crew staged a sit-in at the Cambridge Theatre to protest that low audience numbers were due to the poor marketing and media engagement by the producers. Blake and Langton appeared on Alan Titchmarsh's daytime TV show to raise awareness of the show.

Kerryson revived the show at the Leicester Haymarket in 1998 starring Kathryn Evans and Linzi Hateley.

Diane Langton returned to the show in 2004, this time playing Anna, at the Belgrade Theatre in Coventry.

Porchlight Music Theatre presented The Rink as a part of their "Porchlight Revisits" season in which they stage three forgotten musicals per year. It was in Chicago, Illinois in October 2016. It was directed and choreographed by Christopher Pazdernik and music directed by Ryan Brewster.

Caroline O'Connor (who understudied Diane Langton as Angel in the 1988 London production before starring in Chicago, Mack and Mabel and Anastasia)  played the role of Anna in a revival at London's Southwark Playhouse in May 2018. This production was highly praised for the main performances by Caroline O’Connor and Gemma Sutton and for the inventive choreography (including tap dancing on roller skates) but changes to the script and score by the show's director and dramaturg were less popular (the opening number Coloured Lights was moved to the end of Act 1, leaving the show to start with dialogue. A huge section of Mrs A, where Anna's rejection of her faith is explored, was cut.  Sections of All The Children In A Row, where Angel's lover died in a car crash prompting her search for her father, were replaced with the repetition of an incongruous line “I’m going to find my father”).

Response
In The New York Times, critic Frank Rich praised Rivera but described the show as "turgid" and "sour," filled with "phony, at times mean-spirited content" and "empty pretensions."  Of the book, he wrote, "Mr. McNally is a smart and witty playwright, but you'd never know it from this synthetic effort.  His dialogue is banal, and his characters are ciphers."

Reacting to the bad reviews, the show's composer, John Kander, commented that the show "was the most complete realization" of his intentions of any production he had done.  Lyricist Fred Ebb agreed, asserting that "Every single element of it was exactly as we imagined. Up there on the stage were two of my best friends, Liza and Chita. It was an overwhelming experience; and when they weren't treated well, it was as if we had gotten attacked on the street....  That show hurt me more than any show I've written....  I felt that I had let them down."

Song list

Act I
 Colored Lights
 Chief Cook and Bottle Washer
 Don't Ah Ma Me
 Blue Crystal
 Under the Roller Coaster
 Not Enough Magic
 We Can Make It
 After All These Years
 Angel's Rink and Social Center
 What Happened to the Old Days?

Act II
 The Apple Doesn't Fall (Very Far From the Tree)
 Marry Me
 Mrs. A
 The Rink
 Wallflower
 All the Children in a Row
 Finale

Awards and nominations

Original Broadway production

References

External links
 
The Rink plot, songs, production notes at guidetomusicaltheatre.com

1984 musicals
Broadway musicals
Original musicals
Musicals by Kander and Ebb
Musicals by Terrence McNally
Liza Minnelli soundtracks
Tony Award-winning musicals